Expro is an energy services provider headquartered in Houston, Texas, United States.

History
The company was founded by J. Trewhella, J. Ross and H. Green in 1973 at Great Yarmouth as Exploration & Production Services (North Sea) Ltd with the objective of carrying out well testing in the North Sea. In 1986, about 84% of the company was acquired by Flextech from whom the management subsequently bought out the business in 1992. The company was first listed on the London Stock Exchange in 1994. In 2006, it acquired PowerWell Services, another leading well management concern, for $674.5 million.

Takeover
In May 2008, Halliburton made a £1.7 billion takeover of the business, while a competing bid worth £1.8bn was made the following month by Umbrellastream, a Candover-led consortium also comprising Goldman Sachs and Alpinvest. An improved bid from Halliburton was then rejected by the Expro board, a position backed by the High Court after an appeal lodged by a group of activist shareholders. The acquisition of Expro by Umbrellastream was completed in July 2008.

In March 2021 Expro announced a merger with Frank's International. The merger was completed in October 2021 and began trading under NYSE:XPRO.

References

External links
 

Companies based in Reading, Berkshire
Companies formerly listed on the London Stock Exchange
Business services companies established in 1973
1973 establishments in England
Oilfield services companies
Engineering companies of the United Kingdom
Privately held companies of the United Kingdom
Technology companies established in 1973